Lycée Pareto ( or Liceo Pareto) is a private Italian international school in Lausanne, Switzerland. It serves upper secondary (senior high school/sixth form college) level students.

It was founded by Professor Comini in 1948. At the end of the 2002–2003 school year it moved to its current facility.

Accreditation
Lycée Pareto's (upper) secondary education (Middle and High School) is not approved as a Mittelschule/Collège/Liceo by the Swiss Federal State Secretariat for Education, Research and Innovation (SERI).

References

External links
  Lycée Pareto

Italian international schools in Switzerland
Schools in Lausanne
1948 establishments in Switzerland
Educational institutions established in 1948
Secondary schools in Switzerland